The Walker is a 2007 independent crime drama film written and directed by Paul Schrader and starring Woody Harrelson, Kristin Scott Thomas, Lauren Bacall, Ned Beatty, Lily Tomlin, Willem Dafoe, Moritz Bleibtreu and Mary Beth Hurt. It is the fourth installment in Schrader's night workers series of films, starting with Taxi Driver in 1976, followed by American Gigolo in 1980 and Light Sleeper in 1992.

Synopsis 
A middle-aged gay man in Washington, D. C., Carter Page III, is a male escorta "walker"a single man who escorts other men's wives to social events, rather than their husbands. One of the women he escorts, Lynn Lockner, is married to a United States senator and is having an affair with a lobbyist. When the lobbyist is murdered, she embroils Carter in an investigation that leads to the highest levels of the federal government.

Cast 
 Woody Harrelson as Carter Page III
 Kristin Scott Thomas as Lynn Lockner
 Lauren Bacall as Natalie Van Miter
 Ned Beatty as Jack Delorean
 Moritz Bleibtreu as Emek Yoglu
 Mary Beth Hurt as Chrissie Morgan
 Lily Tomlin as Abigail Delorean
 Willem Dafoe as Senator Larry Lockner
 William Hope as Mungo Tenant

Production 
Schrader completed the script in 2002. Initially the film was to be a direct sequel to American Gigolo, with Julian Kaye (played by Richard Gere) as the lead character. The director originally wanted Kevin Kline to play the lead.

The Page character was based on Jerry Zipkin, for whom the term "walker" was coined.

Critical reception 
The film received positive reviews in its premiere run in the Berlin, Sydney, and Cambridge film festivals. The Walker was released direct-to-DVD but played in an independent film theater for two weeks in Dorris, California. The film received mixed reviews from critics. On the review aggregator Rotten Tomatoes, the film holds a 52% approval rating, based on 63 reviews with an average score of 5.3/10. On Metacritic, the film had an average score of 51 out of 100, based on 26 reviews indicating "mixed or average reviews".

References

External links 
 
 
 
 
 

2007 films
2007 crime drama films
American crime drama films
American LGBT-related films
British crime drama films
British LGBT-related films
2000s English-language films
Films directed by Paul Schrader
Films set in Washington, D.C.
Films with screenplays by Paul Schrader
Films scored by Anne Dudley
2000s American films
2000s British films